Calliotropis pyramoeides is a species of sea snail, a marine gastropod mollusk in the family Eucyclidae.

Description
The size of the shell varies between 4 mm and 6 mm, and is broadly conical in shape, globular and finely granulate, with discontinuous spiral ribs. The shell features spiral and axial ribs with spines at intersections. Spines lower on the whorl develop into C-shaped lamellae. The umbilicus is broad and encircled by a rib, with spiral and axial ribs inside.

Distribution
This marine species occurs off New Caledonia.

References

 Vilvens C. (2007) New records and new species of Calliotropis from Indo-Pacific. Novapex 8 (Hors Série 5): 1–72.

External links
 

pyramoeides
Gastropods described in 2007